Renzo Fratini (born 25 April 1944) is an Italian prelate of the Roman Catholic Church and diplomat of the Holy See. He became an apostolic nuncio in 1998 and ended his career as nuncio to Spain. As he resigned in 2019, the Holy See distanced itself from his criticism of the Spanish government's plans to relocate the remains of Francisco Franco.

Biography
Renzo Fratini was born on 25 April 1944, in Urbisaglia, Italy, and was ordained priest on 6 September 1969 for the Diocese of Macerata-Tolentino. In 1970 he entered the Pontifical Ecclesiastical Academy to prepare for a career as a diplomat. He entered the diplomatic service of the Holy See in 1974, and served in the Pontifical diplomatic missions in France, Japan, Nigeria, Ethiopia, Greece, Ecuador, Israel and the Palestinian Territories.

On 7 August 1993 he was appointed Titular Archbishop of Botriana and Apostolic Pro-Nuncio to Pakistan. He was consecrated bishop on 2 October 1993.

Pope John Paul II appointed Fratini Nuncio to Indonesia on 8 August 1998 and added the post of Nuncio to East Timor on 24 June 2003. He was transferred to Nuncio to Nigeria on 27 January 2004.

On 20 August 2009 he was named Nuncio to Spain and Andorra. He was also given the responsibilities of the Holy See's Permanent Observer to the World Tourism Organization. An unidentified archbishop said his posting in Madrid was "an irrelevant decade" in which he had no influence on church affairs and never felt comfortable with the political environment. Initially Cardinal Antonio María Rouco Varela did not need a nuncio to communicate with the Vatican and the election of Pope Francis, who has his own Spanish contacts, ended any influence he might have had.

On 4 July 2019, Pope Francis accepted his resignation from his diplomatic positions. On 30 June 2019, shortly before that formal retirement, Fratini had criticized the Spanish government's plans to exhume and reinter the remains of Spanish dictator Francisco Franco in a less prominent place, and the Holy See Press Office had disassociated the Vatican from his remarks and said Fratini spoke "in a personal capacity" and "on the occasion of [his] definitive departure from Spain, on the conclusion of his mandate". The Spanish government had issued a formal protest that characterized Fratini's remarks as interference in Spanish domestic affairs.

See also
 List of heads of the diplomatic missions of the Holy See

References

External links

 Renzo Fratini at Catholic Hierarchy 

 

1944 births
Pontifical Ecclesiastical Academy alumni
Apostolic Nuncios to Pakistan
Apostolic Nuncios to Indonesia
Apostolic Nuncios to East Timor
Apostolic Nuncios to Nigeria
Apostolic Nuncios to Spain
Apostolic Nuncios to Andorra
Living people
20th-century Italian Roman Catholic titular archbishops
Italian expatriates in Pakistan
People from the Province of Macerata
21st-century Italian Roman Catholic titular archbishops